Walter Brenner may refer to:

 Walter Brenner (1923–2017), American chemist, professor, and inventor
 Walter Brenner (computer scientist) (born 1958), Swiss academic and Professor of Information Management